James William Parsons (born 27 November 1986) is a New Zealand retired Rugby union player who played as a hooker for the  in Super Rugby and North Harbour in the ITM Cup. He has also played two matches for the All Blacks. He is one of just 3 players that have ever become a Blues centurion and Player of the Year

Early life 
He was born in Palmerston North and educated at King's College in Auckland, completing his education in 2004.

Career 
He was first selected for North Harbour in 2007 and went on to become a centurion for the province. In 2012 he debuted for the Blues in Super Rugby, his first game being against the Highlanders.

After being called up to the All Blacks squad as injury cover, he made his international debut against Scotland on 15 November 2014. Parsons is one of eight All Blacks to have come from the Takapuna Rugby Club.

In 2015, he gave up his starting spot to the retiring Keven Mealamu in his 50th appearance for the Blues against Highlanders at Eden Park. Parsons would take over as the captain of the Blues the following year.

Parsons was re-selected for New Zealand in 2016, following the injury of Nathan Harris, playing off the bench against Australia in Westpac Stadium for the Bledisloe Series. Parsons was later injured himself at a training session, preventing any further game time that year. In the same year he won Blues Player of the Year.

In 2019 Parsons re-signed with the Blues until 2021.

In January 2021, Parsons announced his retirement from rugby, on medical advice.

Notes

External links
 
 James Parsons | Rugby Database Profile
 

1986 births
Living people
New Zealand rugby union players
New Zealand international rugby union players
Rugby union hookers
Blues (Super Rugby) players
North Harbour rugby union players
Rugby union players from Palmerston North